Sidney Eddie Mosesian (July 14, 1939 – September 21, 2019), known professionally as Sid Haig, was an American actor, film producer, and musician. He was known for his roles in several of Jack Hill's blaxploitation films from the 1970s, as well as for his appearances in horror films, most notably his role as Captain Spaulding in the Rob Zombie films House of 1000 Corpses, The Devil's Rejects and 3 from Hell. Haig's Captain Spaulding, and Haig himself, have been called icons of horror cinema. Haig had a leading role on the television series Jason of Star Command as the villain Dragos. He appeared in many television programs, including The Untouchables, Batman, Gunsmoke, Mission: Impossible, Mary Hartman, Mary Hartman, Star Trek, Get Smart, The Rockford Files, Charlie's Angels, Fantasy Island, Buck Rogers in the 25th Century, The Dukes of Hazzard, The A-Team, MacGyver, and Emergency!.

Early life
Haig was born in Fresno, California to Armenian parents. He was the son of Roxy (Mooradian) and Haig Mosesian, an electrician. As a young man, his rapid growth interfered with his motor coordination, prompting him to take dancing lessons. At seven years old, he worked as a paid dancer in a children's Christmas show and later joined a vaudeville revival show.

Haig was also a musician, playing a wide range of music styles on the drums, including swing, country, jazz, blues and rock and roll. Haig began to earn money from music, and signed a recording contract one year out of high school. Still a teenager, Haig went on to record the single "Full House" with the T-Birds in 1958, which reached No. 4 in the charts.

The Pasadena Playhouse
While Haig was in high school, the head of the drama department was Alice Merrill, who encouraged him to pursue an acting career. Merrill had been a Broadway actress who had maintained her contacts in the business. During his senior year, a play was produced in which Merrill double cast the show, to have one of her Hollywood friends assess the actors in order to select the final cast.

Dennis Morgan, a musical comedy personality from the 1940s, saw Haig perform, and chose him for a prominent role in the play. Two weeks later, he returned to see the show and advised Haig to continue his education in the San Fernando Valley and to consider acting as a career. Two years later, Haig enrolled in the Pasadena Playhouse, the school that trained such noted actors as Robert Preston, Gene Hackman, and Dustin Hoffman. He later moved to Hollywood with longtime friend and Pasadena Playhouse roommate Stuart Margolin.

Acting career
Haig's first acting role was in a 1960 short student film titled The Host, directed by Jack Hill at UCLA. This launched Haig's more-than-four-decade acting career in over fifty films and 350 television episodes. Haig became a staple in Hill's films, such as Spider Baby, Coffy and Foxy Brown. In 1971, Haig appeared in THX 1138, the feature film directorial debut of George Lucas, as well as the James Bond film Diamonds Are Forever.

Haig's television debut was a role in a 1962 episode of The Untouchables. He also appeared in a number of other television programs, including Batman, The Man from U.N.C.L.E., Gunsmoke, Mission: Impossible, Star Trek, Get Smart, The Flying Nun, Mary Hartman, Mary Hartman, Emergency!, Charlie's Angels, Jason of Star Command, Fantasy Island, Buck Rogers in the 25th Century, The Dukes of Hazzard, The A-Team, MacGyver, and Just the Ten of Us.

Haig temporarily retired from acting in 1992, feeling typecast: "I just didn't want to play stupid heavies anymore. They just kept giving me the same parts but just putting different clothes on me. It was stupid, and I resented it, and I wouldn't have anything to do with it". Haig did not work in acting for five years, instead training and becoming a certified hypnotherapist. During this time, he was offered the role of Marsellus Wallace (later to be played by Ving Rhames) in Pulp Fiction, the second feature film directed by Quentin Tarantino. At the time, Haig was concerned that low-budget television had been detrimental to his career and, at seeing the shooting script and the short number of days dedicated for each locale, he reportedly passed on the project; he is said to have later regretted this decision. Haig later appeared as a judge in Tarantino's 1997 film Jackie Brown, a part written specifically for Haig by Tarantino.

In 2003, Haig starred in Rob Zombie's debut film House of 1000 Corpses, as a psychotic clown named Captain Spaulding. The role revived Haig's acting career, earning him a "Best Supporting Actor" award in the 13th Annual Fangoria Chainsaw Awards, and an induction into Fangoria's Horror Hall of Fame. Haig reprised his role as Spaulding in the 2005 film The Devil's Rejects, a continuation of House of 1000 Corpses, in which Spaulding is portrayed as the patriarch of the murderous Firefly family. Captain Spaulding has since been considered a modern icon of horror cinema, and Haig himself has been called a "horror icon". For his reprisal of the role in The Devil's Rejects, he received the award for "Best Actor" in the 15th Annual Fangoria Chainsaw Awards, and shared the award for "Most Vile Villain" at the First Annual Spike TV Scream Awards with Leslie Easterbrook, Sheri Moon, and Bill Moseley as the Firefly family. Haig was also nominated as "Best Butcher" in the Fuse/Fangoria Chainsaw Awards, but lost to Tobin Bell's Jigsaw from Saw II.

Haig reunited with Rob Zombie for the director's 2007 Halloween remake, with Haig playing the role of cemetery caretaker Chester Chesterfield. He again reprised his role as Captain Spaulding for Zombie's 2009 animated film The Haunted World of El Superbeasto, and appeared in Zombie's 2013 film The Lords of Salem, as well as in the films Hatchet III and Devil in My Ride.

In 2019, Haig appeared as Captain Spaulding for the final time in the Rob Zombie film 3 from Hell, a sequel to House of 1000 Corpses and The Devil's Rejects. He posthumously appeared in the 2020 slasher film Hanukkah, as well as the 2023 film Abruptio.

Personal life and death
On November 2, 2007, Haig married Susan L. Oberg.

In early September 2019, Haig was hospitalized after falling at his home in Thousand Oaks, California. While recovering, he contracted Aspergillus pneumonia after aspirating vomit in his sleep. He died on September 21, 2019, at the age of 80.

Selected filmography

Film

Television

References

Further reading

External links

 
 
 
 
 
 Sid Haig (Aveleyman)

1939 births
2019 deaths
20th-century American male actors
21st-century American male actors
Accidental deaths in California
Accidental deaths from falls
American male film actors
American male television actors
American people of Armenian descent
Male actors from Fresno, California